The Asian green bee-eater (Merops orientalis), also known as little green bee-eater, and green bee-eater in Sri Lanka, is a near passerine bird in the bee-eater family. It is resident but prone to seasonal movements and is found widely distributed across Asia from coastal southern Iran east through the Indian subcontinent to Vietnam. Populations in Africa and the Arabian Peninsula that were formerly assigned to this species (under the name Green Bee-eater) are now considered distinct species. They are mainly insect eaters and they are found in grassland, thin scrub and forest often quite far from water. Several regional plumage variations are known and several subspecies have been named.

Taxonomy and systematics 
The Asian green bee-eater was first described by the English ornithologist John Latham in 1801 using its current binomial name. Several populations have been designated as subspecies:
 M. o. beludschicus (=M. o. biludschicus) Iran to Pakistan (paler colours with a blue throat)
 M. o. orientalis in India and Sri Lanka (has head and neck tinged with rufous). 
 M. o. ferrugeiceps (=birmanus) in northeastern India, Myanmar, Thailand and Vietnam (has rufous crown, mane and mantle). 
 M. o. ceylonicus in Sri Lanka has the nape and hindneck with more pronounced golden brown sheen often included within the nominate race
The African green bee-eater (M. viridissimus, along with its subspecies M. v. viridissimus, M. v. cleopatra, and M. v. flavoviridis) and Arabian green bee-eater (M. cyanophrys, along with its subspecies M. c. cyanophrys and M. c. muscatensis) were formerly considered conspecific, but were split as distinct species by the IOC in 2021.

A study of species within the genus Merops based on plumage characteristics found that most of the subspecies of M. o. orientalis grouping together with the most similar species being Merops leschenaulti and subspecies M. o. ferrugeiceps appeared closer to that group.

Description 

Like other bee-eaters, this species is a richly coloured, slender bird. It is about 9 inches (16–18 cm) long with about 2 inches made up by the elongated central tail-feathers. The sexes are not visually distinguishable. The entire plumage is bright green and tinged with blue especially on the chin and throat. The crown and upper back are tinged with golden rufous. The flight feathers are rufous washed with green and tipped with blackish. A fine black line runs in front of and behind the eye. The iris is crimson and the bill is black while the legs are dark grey. The feet are weak with the three toes joined at the base. Southeast Asian birds have rufous crown and face, and green underparts, whereas Arabian beludschicus has a green crown, blue face and bluish underparts. The wings are green and the beak is black. The elongated tail feathers are absent in juveniles. Sexes are alike.

The calls is a nasal trill tree-tree-tree-tree, usually given in flight.

Leucistic individuals have been noted.

Distribution and habitat 
This is an abundant and fairly tame bird, familiar throughout its range. It is a bird which breeds in open country with bushes. In Africa and Arabia it is found in arid areas, but is more diverse in its habitats further east.  This species often hunts from low perches, maybe only a metre or less high. It readily makes use of fence wires and electric wires. Unlike some other bee-eaters, they can be found well away from water.

They are mostly seen in the plains but can sometimes be found up to 5000 or 6000 feet in the Himalayas. They are resident in the lowlands of South Asia but some populations move seasonally but the patterns are not clear, moving away to drier regions in the rainy season and to warmer regions in winter. In parts of Pakistan, they are summer visitors.

Behaviour and ecology 

Like other species in the genus, bee-eaters predominantly eat insects, especially bees, wasps and ants, which are caught in the air by sorties from an open perch. Before swallowing prey, a bee-eater removes stings and breaks the exoskeleton of the prey by repeatedly thrashing it on the perch. Migration is not known but they make seasonal movements in response to rainfall. These birds are somewhat sluggish in the mornings and may be found huddled next to each other on wires sometimes with their bills tucked in their backs well after sunrise. They sand-bathe more frequently than other bee-eater species and will sometimes bathe in water by dipping into water in flight. They are usually seen in small groups and often roost communally in large numbers (200-300). The birds move excitedly at the roost site and call loudly, often explosively dispersing before settling back to the roost tree.
The little green bee-eater is also becoming common in urban and sub-urban neighborhoods, and has been observed perching on television antennae, only to launch into a brief, zig-zag flight formation to catch an insect, then return to the same perch and consume the meal. This behaviour is generally observed between the hours of 7:00 and 8:00am, and after 4:00pm.

The breeding season is from March to June. Unlike many bee-eaters, these are often solitary nesters, making a tunnel in a sandy bank. The breeding pairs are often joined by helpers. They nest in hollows in vertical mud banks. The nest tunnel that they construct can run as much as 5 feet long and the 3-5 eggs are laid on the bare ground in the cavity at the end of the tunnel. The eggs are very spherical and glossy white. Clutch size varies with rainfall and insect food density. Both sexes incubate. The eggs hatch asynchronously with an incubation period of about 14 days and the chicks grow fledge in 3 to 4 weeks and in the fledging stage show a reduction in body weight. A study suggested that green bee-eaters may be capable of interpreting the behaviour of human observers. They showed an ability to predict whether a human at a particular location would be capable of spotting the nest entrance and then behaved appropriately to avoid giving away the nest location. The ability to look at a situation from another's point of view was previously believed to be possessed only by primates.

Riverside habitats were found to support high populations in southern India (157 birds per square kilometre) dropping off too 101 per km² in agricultural areas and 43-58 per square km near human habitations.

They feed on flying insects and can sometimes be nuisance to bee-keepers. The preferred prey was mostly beetles followed by hymenopterans. Orthopterans appear to be avoided. They are sometimes known to take crabs. Like most other birds they regurgitate the hard parts of their prey as pellets.

An endoparasitic nematode (Torquatoides balanocephala) sometimes infects their gizzard. A protozoal parasite in their blood, Haemoproteus manwelli, has been described from India.

References

External links 

 Internet Bird Collection

Meropidae
Birds of Africa
Birds of South Asia
Birds of Southeast Asia
Birds described in 1801
Taxa named by John Latham (ornithologist)
Articles containing video clips